De'Lacy was an American 1990s house-music group that was most famous for its single "Hideaway."

Overview
Initially, the group consisted of De'Lacy Davis—percussionist and ex-Police Officer in New Jersey, Gary Griffin—bassist and keyboard player, Glenn Branch—drummer and backing vocalist, and Rainie Lassiter—lead vocalist (her daughter, A-La Renee Davis, is also an actress and singer).

The band split in the late 1990s, which left Davis, Branch, and Lassiter on vocals. In 2008, De'Lacy connected with the British songwriter and record producer Marco Gee. They joined forces to produce "Bodyswereve," with production assistance from the New Jersey-based producer Walter Brooks.

The group continues to record with music producers in the UK and US.

Discography

Singles

References

American house music groups